Bulgaria has been producing films since 1915. Bulgarian cinema is known for the pioneering work of directors like Donyo Donev in the field of animation. The filming and screening of Vasil Gendov's film Bulgaran is Gallant (1915) is considered to be the beginning of Bulgarian cinematography. Historically, Bulgarian films have been noted for their realism, social themes and technical innovation.

From 1915 to 1948, when film production was nationalized, 55 films were made, but production slowed down after the beginning of World War II. During the time of the Fatherland Front government, films with a historical focus were given bigger funding. The biggest studio at that time was the Boyana Film Studio.

Notable Bulgarian film directors are Rangel Vulchanov, Christo Christov, Georgi Djulgerov. Other filmmakers of note are Kristina Grozeva and Petar Valchanov, who directed the Crystal Globe-winning film The Father (2019), and Theodore Ushev whose film Blind Vaysha (2016) was nominated for an Academy Award. Bulgarian actors who have accrued critical success and worldwide recognition include Nina Dobrev and Maria Bakalova.

The Golden Rose Film Festival was first held in 1961 and was the biggest Bulgarian film festival throughout the 20th century. In 1997, the Sofia Film Fest was held for the first time. In 2007, Variety included it in its list of 50 best film festivals.

Directors
See List of Bulgarian film directors

Actors
See also List of Bulgarian actors

Stefan Valdobrev
Nikolay Binev
Stoyan Bachvarov
Rusi Chanev
Georgi Cherkelov
Stefan Danailov
Nina Dobrev
Itzhak Fintzi
Georgi Georgiev-Getz
Anton Gorchev
Kiril Gospodinov
Stanislav Ianevski
Georgi Kaloyanchev
Velko Kanev
Apostol Karamitev
Asen Kisimov
Nevena Kokanova
Todor Kolev
Konstantin Kotsev
Tatyana Lolova
Georgi Mamalev
Hristo Mutafchiev
Stoyanka Mutafova
Lyubomir Neikov
Dimitar Panov
Georgi Partsalev
Katya Paskaleva
Pavel Popandov
Petar Popyordanov
Georgi Rusev
Krastyu Sarafov
Yosif Sarchadzhiev
Hristo Shopov
Naum Shopov
Petar Slabakov
Nikola Todev
Kosta Tsonev
Grigor Vachkov
Martina Vachkova
Ani Valchanova
Philip Trifonoff
Maria Bakalova
Nick Stanchev

Animators
Donyo Donev

Festivals
Sofia International Film Festival
In The Palace International Short Film Festival
Sofia Documentary
Cinelibri

Notable films

(1910) Bulgaran is Gallant - The Bulgarian is Gallant (considered the first Bulgarian movie)
(1917) Baronat - Baronet
(1917) Lyubovta e ludost - The Love is Crazy
(1921) Dyavolat v Sofia - The Devil in Sofia
(1922) Bay Ganyo - Bay Ganyo
(1929) Nai-vyarnata strazha - The Most Loyal Guard
(1958) Lyubimetz 13 - Favourite #13
(1962) Tyutyun - Tobacco (nominated for a Golden Palm award at the Cannes Film Festival in 1963)
(1964) Kradetzat Na Praskovi - The Peach-Garden Trespasser
(1970) Kit - Whale
(1970) Bash Maystorat - The Past-Master
(1972) Kozijat Rog - The Goat Horn
(1973) Prebroyavane na Divite Zaytsi - The Hare Census
(1973) Siromashko Lyato - Indian Summer
(1974) Selyaninat s Koleloto - A Peasant on a Bicycle
(1975) Osadeni Dushi - Doomed Souls
(1975) Svatbite na Ivan Asen - The Weddings of King Ivan Assen
(1976) Shturets v Uhoto - A Cricket in the Ear
(1976) Dva Dioptara Dalekogledstvo - Farsighted for Two Diopters
(1978) Toplo - Warmth
(1980) Dami Kanyat - Ladies Choice
(1981) Asparuh - Khan Asparoukh
(1981) Orkestar bez ime - A Nameless Band
(1983) Gospodin za Edin Den - King for a Day
(1984) Opasen Char - Dangerous Charm
(1988) Vreme na nasilie - Time of Violence
(1988) Vchera - Yesterday
(2001) Pismo do Amerika - Letter to America
(2001) Opashkata Na Diavola - Devil's Tail
(2004) Mila ot Mars - Mila from Mars
(2005) Otkradnati Ochi - Stolen Eyes
(2006) Razsledvane - Investigation
(2008) Dzift - Zift
(2010) Misiya London - Mission London
(2010) HDSP: Lov na drebni hishtnici - HDSP: Hunting down small predators
(2011) Tilt - TILT
(2012) Sofia's Last Ambulance
(2014) The Lesson (2014 Bulgarian film)
(2014) The sinking of Sozopol
(2015) The Girl From The Vile Land - Момичето от НиЗката Земя
(2015) 11"А"
(2016) Slava - Glory
(2016) Singing shoes-Пеещите обувки
(2016) Holidaymakers (2016 Bulgarian film) -Летовници
(2016) Voevoda (2016 Bulgarian film)-Воевода
(2017) Elevation (2017 Bulgarian film)-Възвишение
(2017) The Omnipresent (2017 Bulgarian film)-Въздесъщият
(2017) 12"A"
(2017) Radiogram (2017 Bulgarian film)-Радиограмофон
(2017) NoOne (2017 Bulgarian film)-Никой
(2018) All she wrote (2018 Bulgarian film)-Всичко което тя написа
(2018) Revolution X (2018 Bulgarian film)-Революция X
(2020) Yatagan (2020 Bulgarian film)-''ЯТАГАН'

See also
Cinema of the world
History of cinema
List of famous Bulgarians
Sofia International Film Festival
World cinema

References

External links
Sofia International Film Festival Website
New Bulgarian Cinema (College Gate Press, 2008) by Dina Iordanova
KinoKultura Special Issue on Bulgarian Cinema edited by Dina Iordanova and Ron Holloway. Special Issue 5: Bulgarian Cinema (Dec. 2006)